All Saints is a parish church in Sutton, Kent. It was begun in the 12th century and is a Grade II listed building.

The south porch and vestry was added in 1857 and an apse added in 1861 by Arthur Ashpitel.

References

External links

Sutton